Rajiv S Ruia is an Indian writer and film director.

Early life
Rajiv was born on 5 August to parents Shyam S Ruia and Rani S Ruia. His native roots are from Rajasthan. However Rajiv was born and brought up in Mumbai. Rajiv studied in Fatima Devi English High School in Mumbai. He did his diploma in Software Engineer and photo designing from S.M. Lal College, Mumbai. With his dream in filmmaking, Rajiv started learning film editing at the age of 16. He joined veteran filmmaker Vijay Reddy & Raman Kumar as an assistant director. He worked with him for 7 years whilst he learnt about film
writing and film directing.

Career
Rajiv started his career by working in television. He started his career as an associate director and editor. He also started making music videos and went on to make more than 200 music videos. Rajiv introduced a lot of talented technicians and artists to the film industry. Many of them are well established in the industry today. Rajiv's first super hit film was My Friend Ganesha which was the first composite animation movie to be made in India. The film instantly became favourite among kids. The movie had been telecasted more than thousand times on television. Rajiv went on to make the sequels in My Friend Ganesha 2, My Friend Ganesha 3 and My Friend Ganesha 4 . His other movie was Main Krishna Hoon, with actress Juhi Chawla. The film also had Hrithik Roshan and Katrina Kaif in cameo roles..

Awards
He also won NIFF Best International Director award in 2014 and Golden Achiever Award in 2015 for best story and direction. Rajiv also won an award for the movie Flame in 2014.

Filmography

References

Film directors from Mumbai
Living people
Year of birth missing (living people)